Majhawan is a constituency of the Uttar Pradesh Legislative Assembly covering the city of Majhawan in the Mirzapur district of Uttar Pradesh, India.

Majhawan is one of five assembly constituencies in the Mirzapur Lok Sabha constituency. Since 2008, this assembly constituency is numbered 397 amongst 403 constituencies.

Election results

2022

2017
Bharatiya Janta Party candidate Suchismita won in 2017 Uttar Pradesh Legislative Elections by defeating Bahujan Samaj Party candidate Ramesh Chand Bind by a margin of 41,159 votes.

References

External links
 

Assembly constituencies of Uttar Pradesh
Mirzapur district